Mary Ann Ogden Avery (1825 – 1911) was an art collector and museum benefactor active in New York City. She left works to the Metropolitan Museum of Art and Columbia University.

Ogden was born in New York and married the engraver-art dealer Samuel Putnam Avery in 1844. Together they had six children. In 1857 the couple lost their four-year-old daughter Emma and soon after Mary began to accompany her husband on yearly trips to purchase art on speculation for resale on the New York market. The couple commissioned works by living artists and corresponded with various artists in their acquaintance. Mary was herself a watercolorist and collected spoons as a hobby, which she later donated to the Metropolitan. The catalog, dated 1898, mentions the places she collected spoons: universal exhibitions of Paris 1867, 1878, 1889, and of Vienna 1873. Bric-à-brac shops in London, Chester, Liverpool, Paris, Lille, Rouen, Blois, Brussels, Antwerp, Amsterdam, Hague, Haarlem, Berlin, Frankfort, Nuremberg, Düsseldorf, and Prague.

In 1886 the couple lost another daughter, Fanny, and began to make charitable donations. Their Avery Hospital in Hartford was probably the result of Fanny's death there. Their son Henry had studied art and later became an architect. Upon his early death in 1890, the couple commissioned the Avery memorial library in his name for Columbia University. Their daughter Ellen died in 1893 and their eldest child Henrietta died in 1900. The couple continued living with their only surviving child Samuel Jr. in their New York City gallery, who took over the family business. When Mary's husband died in 1904 she oversaw the donation of their collection to the Metropolitan and later moved with her son to Hartford, where she died.

Spoon collection
A few notable spoons from her collection:

References  

 Avery Library history on website of Columbia University.
 The Collection of spoons made by Mrs. S.P. Avery, 1867-1890 : presented by her to the Metropolitan Museum of Art 1897, on Hathitrust

1825 births
1911 deaths
People from New York City
American art collectors